Universidad station may refer to:

Universidad station (Medellín), Colombia
Universidad metro station (Mexico City), Mexico
Universidad station (Puerto Rico), in San Juan
Universidad metro station (San Nicolás de los Garza), Nuevo León, Mexico
Universidad Católica metro station, Santiago
Universidad de Chile metro station, Santiago
Universidad de Santiago metro station, Santiago
Universidad Rey Juan Carlos (Madrid Metro), Spain
Amín Abel metro station, a metro station in Santo Domingo, Dominican Republic previously called Universidad
Universidad, a station on the Málaga Metro
Universidad, a station on the Maracaibo Metro

See also
Ciudad Universitaria (disambiguation), for other stations
University Station (disambiguation)